Cosimo Commisso (born November 28, 1965) is a Canadian former soccer player who earned five caps for the national team in 1988. 

In 1982, he played in the National Soccer League with Toronto Italia, and was drafted by the Toronto Blizzard in 1983. He returned to former club Toronto Italia for the 1986 season. He played club football for the Hamilton Steelers and North York Rockets.

References

Canadian National Soccer League players
Canadian Soccer League (1987–1992) players
Canada men's youth international soccer players
Canada men's international soccer players
Canadian soccer players
Canadian people of Italian descent
Hamilton Steelers (1981–1992) players
North York Rockets players
Toronto Italia players
Living people
Association football forwards
Soccer players from Toronto
1965 births